The Honkbal Rookie League (Dutch for Baseball Rookie League) is a professional baseball league in the Netherlands for rookies from the teams in the Honkbal Hoofdklasse. It is an eight-team league that plays a 42-game schedule. The season runs from April to September and is not followed by a promotion and relegation system.

Current season
The 2011 Honkbal Rookie League season began Friday, April 8.

See also
Baseball in the Netherlands
Baseball awards #Netherlands
Baseball awards #Europe

References

External links
Rookie League at Koninklijke Nederlandse Baseball en Softball Bond

Baseball competitions in the Netherlands
Baseball leagues in Europe
Rookie
Professional sports leagues in the Netherlands